Amir Abbas Ayenechi (January 6, 1994 in Tehran, Iran) is an Iranian football defender, who currently plays for Persepolis in Persian Gulf Pro League.

Club career

Youth teams 
Ayenechi was a member of the Persepolis Youth Academy. Ayenechi Hat-trick in game opposite Esteghlal U-19 team & two assist goal.

Persepolis 
He joined Persepolis in 2015-16 winter transfer with 2 and a half years contracts.

Club career statistics

International career
Ayenechi was called up to Iran U-17 & Iran U-20 & Iran U-23's camp.

Honours

Club

Persepolis
Persian Gulf Pro League runner-up: 2015–16

References

1994 births
Iranian footballers
Living people
Persepolis F.C. players
Sportspeople from Tehran
Association football fullbacks
Association football wingers